The 36th Luna Awards ceremony, presented by the Film Academy of the Philippines (FAP), honored the best Filipino films of 2017. It took place on September 29, 2018 at the Resorts World Manila in Pasay, Philippines.

Winners and nominees

Awards 
Winners are listed first, highlighted in boldface.

Special Awards 
The following honorary awards were also awarded. 

 FPJ Lifetime Achievement Awardee – Charo Santos
 Lamberto Avellana Memorial Awardee – Maryo J. Delos Reyes and Augusto Buenaventura
 Manuel de Leon for Exemplary Achievement Award – Rosa Rosal

References 

Award ceremonies in the Philippines
2018 film awards
Luna Awards